Mount Darling is the highest peak of the Allegheny Mountains, standing  west of Mount Swartley in the Ford Ranges, Marie Byrd Land. The prominence is 998m/3,274ft., the proportional prominence is 1,730m and the elevation is 2,676m. It was discovered on aerial flights from the West Base of the United States Antarctic Service in 1940, and named for Professor Chester A. Darling of Allegheny College, Meadville, Pennsylvania.

References 

Ford Ranges